Berthiaume is a surname. Notable people with the surname include:

Daniel Berthiaume (born 1966), Canadian retired professional ice hockey goaltender
Daniel Berthiaume (singer, songwriter), born in Montreal, Canada
Raymond Berthiaume (born 1931), jazz singer, musician, producer and composer from Québec, Canada
René Berthiaume (born 1952), Canadian politician, who was elected mayor of Hawkesbury, Ontario in the 2010 municipal election
Steve Berthiaume (born 1965), Current Arizona Diamondbacks announcer and a former sportscaster for SportsNet New York (SNY) and ESPN
Trefflé Berthiaume (1848–1915), Canadian typographer, newspaperman and politician

See also
Berthiaume-du-Tremblay Stadium, outdoor football and soccer stadium in Parc Berthiaume-Du-Tremblay in Chomedey, a suburb of Laval, Quebec
Parc Berthiaume-du-Tremblay, park located in Chomedey, a suburb of Laval, Quebec, Canada a short distance from Montreal Island
Berthiaume Lake (Métascouac River), a water body crossed by the Métascouac River, in Lac-Jacques-Cartier, La Côte-de-Beaupré, Capitale-Nationale, in Quebec, to Canada.